Krista Gerlich is an American college basketball coach. She is the head coach of the Texas Tech Lady Raiders basketball team.

West Texas A&M 
On September 18, 2006, Gerlich was named the women's basketball coach at West Texas A&M.

She inherited a 28–4 Lone Star Champion Lady Buff program that lost in the South Central Region Tournament semifinals, including Lone Star player of the year Emily Brister.

UT Arlington 
Gerlich was named the head coach of the Lady Mavericks on April 11, 2013. She accumulated a program-best 121 wins with the Lady Mavs.

Texas Tech 
Texas Tech announced the hiring of Gerlich to lead the Lady Raiders on August 18, 2020, taking over following the scandal of the previous coach Marlene Stollings.

Head Coaching Record

Personal life
Krista is married to former Red Raider linebacker Bryan Gerlich.

Daughter Bryn Gerlich plays basketball at Texas Tech after transferring from Oklahoma State.

References

External links
Texas Tech biography
UT Arlington biography

1970 births
Living people
Sportspeople from Lubbock, Texas
Basketball players from Texas
Texas Tech Lady Raiders basketball coaches
Texas Tech Lady Raiders basketball players
UT Arlington Mavericks women's basketball coaches
West Texas A&M Buffaloes